This is a list of Dinosaur Train episodes.

Series overview

Episodes

Pilot (2008)

Season 1 (2009–11)

Season 2 (2011–13)
The second season of Dinosaur Train began airing on August 22, 2011 with a one-hour special, "Dinosaur Big City." Other hour-long specials during season two included "Dinosaurs A to Z," which aired May 14, 2012 and "Dinosaur Train Submarine Adventure," which aired February 18, 2013.

Season 3 (2014–15)

PBS Kids ordered a third season of 13 half-hour episodes to premiere in the spring of 2014 (that being the first two episodes). The first two episodes aired on January 20, 2014 as a one-hour special titled "Nature Trackers Adventure Camp." The others started to air on August 18, 2014 beginning with the one-hour "Classic in the Jurassic" special.

Season 4 (2015–17)

PBS Kids renewed Dinosaur Train for a fourth season of 10 half-hour episodes, which premiered on December 7, 2015. The final two episodes of the fourth season first aired as a one-hour "What's at The Center of The Earth?" special on February 20, 2017.

Season 5 (2019–20) 
The fifth season of Dinosaur Train consists of 11 half-hour episodes that aired on PBS Kids, starting on August 26, 2019.

References

External links
 

Dinosaur Train
Dinosaur Train